is a Japanese voice actress from Tokyo. She is affiliated with Ken Production. Kokido's first leading role was in Go! Princess PreCure (2015) as Aroma, and since then she has starred as major characters in several titles.

Filmography

Anime 
2013
Magi: The Labyrinth of Magic as Liliana, Sai Lin
Noucome as Daiko Gondo
2014
Majin Bone as young Luke/Shark
Monster Retsuden Oreca Battle as Mimitoshishi
Rail Wars! as Tsubatettsu
2015
Brave Beats as Kotone Amamiya / Wink Beat
Go! Princess PreCure as Aroma
The Rolling Girls as Mii-tan
2016
Digimon Universe: Appli Monsters as Torajirou Asuka
Drifters as Olminu
Poco's Udon World as Poco, Momo
Sekkō Boys as Miki Ishimoto
2020
Kakushigoto: My Dad's Secret Ambition as Yō Shiokoshi
2021
Farewell, My Dear Cramer as Aya Shiratori

Dubbing
A Series of Unfortunate Events as Klaus Baudelaire (Louis Hynes)
Phoebe in Wonderland as Phoebe Lichten (Elle Fanning)
The Powerpuff Girls (2016) as Princess Morbucks (Haley Mancini)

References

External links
  
 
 

Living people
Voice actresses from Tokyo
Japanese video game actresses
Japanese voice actresses
Year of birth missing (living people)
21st-century Japanese actresses
Ken Production voice actors